Favorlang is an extinct Formosan language closely related to Babuza.

Although Favorlang is considered by Taiwanese linguist Paul Jen-kuei Li to be a separate language, it is nevertheless very closely related to Babuza. In fact, the name Favorlang is derived from Babuza. Alternatively, Favorlang may also have represented a dialect of Babuza at an earlier stage, since Favorlang was documented in the mid-17th century, while Babuza was documented only around the turn of the 20th century by Japanese linguists.

Phonology
Favorlang has gone through the following sound changes. Except for the *t, *s, *Z >  merger, all of these sound changes are shared by the five Western Plains languages Taokas, Babuza, Papora, Hoanya, and Thao.
Merger of PAn *n and *ŋ as 
Merger of *t, *s, *Z as 
Merger of *N and *S1 as 
Complete loss of *k, *q, *H
Partial loss of *R, *j, including the loss of final *-y and *-w
*s (in initial and medial positions) >

Sources
Favorlang data sources are:
 Later translated into English:

Word lists collected by Naoyoshi Ogawa in the early 1900s (unpublished manuscripts dated 1900, 1901, and 1930; others are undated)
Notebooks 1, 2, 3, and 5, now kept by ILCAA (Research Institute for Languages and Cultures of Asia and Africa) and TUFS (Tokyo University of Foreign Studies) – call number "OA052"
Notebook 4, now kept at the Anthropological Institute, Nanzan University – call number "v. 1-2-1"

Syntax
Case markers include:
ja 'nominative marker'
ta 'personal name marker'
o, no 'oblique (genitive and accusative, common noun)'
i 'oblique (personal noun)'
de 'locative'
i 'directional'

Agent-focus verbal affixes include:
Agent-focus
-um- ~ -umm- (after consonant-initial verb stems) or um- ~ umm- (before vowel-initial verb stem except i-)
-im-, -em- (lexically conditioned)
m-
p-

Past tense (AF)
-in-umm-, in-umm
m-in-
-in-

Future tense (AF)
Reduplication of the first stem syllable

Imperative (AF)
-a

Non-agent-focus verbal affixes are:
-an 'locative focus'
-en, -in, -n 'patient focus'
ipa- ... -a 'imperative (non-agent-focus)'
-in-, in- 'past tense (non-agent-focus)'
ino- 'future tense (non-agent-focus)'

When -in- and -umm- appear together in a word, -in- usually precedes -um- ~ -umm-, as in Ilokano, Bontok, and some Dusunic languages in Sabah (Rungus Dusun and Kimaragang Dusun). Occasionally, -umm- precedes -in- in several Favorlang lexical forms, but this is not very common.

Pronouns
All of the following personal pronouns are free forms. All genitive pronouns end with -a.

Examples
Namoa tamau tamasea paga de boesum, ipa-dass-a joa naan.
Our father, which art in Heaven, let Thy Name be praised!
Ka-ina paga ta Jehova oa Deosoe, tamasea pina-ijor ijo....
I am the Lord, thy God, who led thee....

References

Bibliography

Formosan languages
Languages of Taiwan
Extinct languages of Asia
Languages attested from the 17th century